Georges Tanguay (2 June 1856 – 21 September 1913) was a Canadian politician.

Born in Quebec City, Quebec, the son of Georges Tanguay and Adeline Mathieu, Tanguay was elected without opposition to the Legislative Assembly of Quebec for the electoral district of Lac-Saint-Jean in 1900. A Liberal, he was re-elected in 1904 and did not run in 1908. He was briefly mayor of Quebec City from 12 January to 1 March 1906.

References
 

1856 births
1913 deaths
Mayors of Quebec City
Quebec Liberal Party MNAs